Mahendru or Mahendra is an Indian (Khatri) surname. Notable people with the surname include: 

Anju Mahendru (born 1946), Indian actress
Annet Mahendru (born 1985), American actress

Indian surnames
Punjabi-language surnames
Surnames of Indian origin
Hindu surnames
Khatri clans
Khatri surnames